The Campeonato Argentino de Rugby 2004  was won for the first time by the selection of Cuyo, (Mondoza).

Campeonato

No relegation, the next year the tournament returned to an eight-team formula.

Ascenso
Due to the new format for year 2005 (eight teams in "Campeonato" instead of six, and merging of "Ascenso" ed "Estimulo", there were two promotions and no relations.

Pool 1

Pool 2

Semifinals

Final

 Tucumán and Mar del Plata promoted to "Campeonato"

Estimulo

Due to the reorder for next season, all the teams were promoted to "Ascenso"

Pool 1

Pool 2

External links 
  Memorias de la UAR 2004
  Francesco Volpe, Paolo Pacitti (Author), Rugby 2005, GTE Gruppo Editorale (2004)

Campeonato Argentino de Rugby
Argentina